The 2021 NRL Women's Premiership was the fifth season of professional women's rugby league in Australia. All games took place in 2022, not 2021, as a result of the COVID-19 pandemic.

Regular season

Round 1

Round 2

Round 3

Round 4

Round 5

Finals Series

Grand Final

References 

Women's rugby league in Australia